Jane Champion (died 1632) was a convict who was the first woman known to be sentenced to death and executed in the territory of today's United States. Champion and her alleged illicit lover, William Gallopin, were accused of murdering and concealing the death of their child.

Jane Champion was married to a wealthy landowner named Percival. At some point in 1630, Champion is alleged to have engaged in an extramarital affair with another colonist, William Gallopin. Champion became pregnant and made lengthy attempts to hide her pregnancy. At the time, adultery itself was sometimes punishable by death. The baby was born sometime in late 1631 or early 1632 and subsequently died. Champion and Gallopin were accused of causing the death of the infant and were charged with murder and concealing the death of the child. They were tried and found guilty, and were subsequently sentenced to death. It is unknown whether Champion was genuinely guilty of the crime, as there is no record of the evidence present at their trials. While Gallopin was sentenced to death, there is no record of his execution taking place, furthering skepticism about the pair's guilt. Champion was executed by hanging in 1632, and her body was donated to science.

References

1632 deaths
17th-century executions of American people
People executed by Virginia
People executed for murder
Pre-statehood history of Virginia
Jamestown, Virginia
American people convicted of murder